FC Yverdon Féminin is a Swiss women's football team from the town of Yverdon-les-Bains. Founded in 1986 as the women's section of Yverdon-Sport FC has played in Switzerland's highest league, the Nationalliga A since the 2006–07 season. In July 2007 it became an independent club, taking its current name.

In 2010, the team won the Swiss Cup against Young Boys Bern, a feat which they repeated in 2011, when they were also the championship's runner-up. In subsequent seasons it has returned to mid-table positions.

Honours

Trophies
 2 Swiss Cups
 2010, 2011

Competition record

2022–23 squad
According to the club's website

Former internationals
  Switzerland: Sandra Betschart, Jehona Mehmeti

References

External links
Official website 

Football clubs in Switzerland
Yverdon-les-Bains
1986 establishments in Switzerland
Women's football clubs in Switzerland